Oysterhaven is a sea-inlet on the coast of County Cork, Ireland, immediately to the east of Kinsale harbour, that is in County Cork . The townlands bordering the northern and eastern sides of the inlet are also known as Oysterhaven.

During the Siege of Kinsale, the English forces besieging the town brought supplies to their camp (which was located to the north of the town) by ship into Oysterhaven and thence by boat up the creek to Brown's Mills.

Oysterhaven is now home to a watersports and "outdoor education" centre.

References

Landforms of County Cork
Inlets of the Republic of Ireland

sv:Oysterhaven